Bayonne Whipple (died February 20, 1937) was the stage name of Fanny Elmina Rose, an actress and vaudeville performer, and the second wife of Canadian actor Walter Huston.

Early life
Fanny Elmina Rose (called Mina) was born in New York, the daughter of Rodney S. Rose and Mary Louisa (Ward) Rose. Her father was a Methodist Episcopal clergyman.

Career
Bayonne Whipple was a vaudeville performer. From 1902 to 1908 she was the heroine, "Ruth Blake", in a stage melodrama called The Ninety and Nine, in New York. In 1909 she met and began working with Walter Huston, a younger actor. At the time she was headlining a touring act called "Harmony Discord".  They formed an act called "Whipple and Huston" that toured for fifteen years. "We sang, danced, did comedy skits," Huston recalled, "and managements soon found out that we could do the time on stage of three acts, so they hired us, so they wouldn't have to pay the salaries of the two acts we replaced." Whipple handled the business side of their work, while Huston wrote their material, although Whipple was credited as co-writer of some songs and skits during this period.  Their act was successful, but ended as Huston's career in theatre and film grew, and Whipple's did not.

Personal life
Bayonne Whipple married Walter Huston as his second wife in December 1914, in Arkansas; they divorced, after years of separation, in 1931. Walter soon remarried. She died at home on Balboa Island, California in 1937, from heart disease. Reports of her age varied; she may have been as young as 60 or as old as 72 at the time of her death. Her gravesite is in Candor, New York.

References

External links
 A 1911 photograph of Bayonne Whipple, in the J. Willis Sayre Collection of Theatrical Photographs, Special Collections, University of Washington Libraries.
 Bayonne Whipple's gravesite on Find a Grave.

1865 births
1937 deaths
American actresses
Huston family
Vaudeville performers